James Lowry Robinson (September 17, 1838 – July 11, 1887) was a Democratic politician from the U.S. state of North Carolina; he served as the fourth lieutenant governor of the state for four years under Governor Thomas J. Jarvis and as acting Governor of North Carolina for one month in 1883.

Early life
Robinson was born and raised in Franklin, North Carolina; he served in the North Carolina militia during the American Civil War and was wounded at the Battle of Seven Pines. Robinson left the military in 1863 and opened a general store in Macon County.

Politics
Robinson was first elected to public office in 1868, when he was chosen to represent Macon County in the North Carolina House of Representatives. He served there until 1875, the last three years as House Speaker. Robinson then moved up to the state senate, where he served three terms between 1876 and 1880, including one as Senate President Pro Tempore.

As president pro tempore, Robinson became (unofficially) acting lieutenant governor in 1879, after Thomas Jordan Jarvis's succession to the governorship. He was elected Lt. Governor is his own right in the 1880 election on the Democratic ticket with Jarvis. Robinson served as acting Governor of North Carolina for four weeks in September 1883 when Governor Jarvis left the state for an extended period to attend an exhibition. The most notable events of his administration were two official pardons granted to prisoners, one to a dying Cherokee man, and one to a murderer who Robinson judged acted in self-defense. Robinson resigned from the office of Lieutenant Governor on 10/31/1884 in order to be a candidate for the state house [North Carolina Government, 1979 version, p. 425; also New York Times, 12/12/1884]. He was elected to the state house from Macon County and served in the legislature of 1885 [North Carolina Government, 1979 version, p. 465].

Later life and death
After his term in the state house, Robinson suffered from financial difficulties. The Raleigh News and Observer reported on 6/11/1887 that Robinson was deathly ill and was being treated by a doctor from Asheville. Robinson died later in the year, according to a list of North Carolinians who died in 1887 listed in the Fayetteville Observer on 1/19/1888.

See also
North Carolina General Assembly of 1868–1869

References

1838 births
1887 deaths
Governors of North Carolina
Members of the North Carolina House of Representatives
Lieutenant Governors of North Carolina
People from Franklin, North Carolina
People of North Carolina in the American Civil War
Speakers of the North Carolina House of Representatives
19th-century American politicians